Boger or Böger is a surname. Notable people with the surname include:

Alnod Boger (1871–1940), English cricketer
Dale L. Boger (born 1953), American medicinal and organic chemist, chair of the Department of Chemistry at The Scripps Research Institute
David Boger (born 1939), Australian chemical engineer
Ernest Boger, African-American student
Haim Boger (1876–1963), Israeli politician who served as a member of the Knesset for the General Zionists between 1951 and 1955
Jerome Boger (born 1955), American football official in the National Football League
Joshua Boger (born 1951), American chemist
Luciano Durán Böger (1904–1996), Bolivian poet, writer and politician
Stefan Böger (born 1966), German football player and manager
Wilhelm Boger (1906–1977), German police commissioner and concentration camp overseer known as "The Tiger of Auschwitz"
William Otway Boger (1895–1918), Canadian World War I flying ace

See also
Boger City, North Carolina, unincorporated community in Lincoln County, North Carolina, United States
Boger-Hartsell Farm, historic home and farm near Concord, Cabarrus County, North Carolina
Constant viscosity elastic (Boger) fluids, elastic fluids with constant viscosity
Boge (disambiguation)
Bogger (disambiguation)
Booger (disambiguation)
Borger (disambiguation)
Oger (disambiguation)

de:Böger